Brihaspa autocratica is a moth in the family Crambidae. It was described by Edward Meyrick in 1933. It is found in the former Katanga Province of the Democratic Republic of the Congo.

References

Moths described in 1933
Schoenobiinae